UTC+5:30 is an identifier for a time offset from UTC of +05:30. This time is used in India and Sri Lanka, and was formerly used in Nepal. It is five and a half hours ahead of Coordinated Universal Time. Around 1.4 billion people live inside this time zone, making it the second-most populous after UTC+08:00.

As standard time (year-round)
Principal cities: , Mumbai, Chennai, Kolkata, Ahmedabad, Bangalore, Hyderabad, Colombo

South Asia
India – Indian Standard Time
Sri Lanka – Sri Lanka Standard Time

See also
Indian Standard Time
Sri Lanka Standard Time
Time in India
Time in Sri Lanka

References

UTC offsets
Time in India
Time in Sri Lanka